Southwell City Football Club is a football club based in Southwell, England. They are currently members of the United Counties League Division One and play at the Centenary Ground, Brinkley.

History
Southwell City were formed in 1893. In the club's early years, they entered the Newark and District League, winning the Challenge Cup in 1911. In 1957, the club joined the Notts Alliance, winning the competition in 2001. In 2003, Southwell joined the Central Midlands League, before leaving in 2017. In 2022, after winning the Nottinghamshire Senior League, the club was admitted into the United Counties League Division One.

Ground
During the early 20th century, the club played at Crafts Fields in Southwell. In 2021, Southwell moved from their Memorial Grounds home in Southwell to the Centenary Ground in the nearby village of Brinkley.

References

Southwell, Nottinghamshire
Association football clubs established in 1893
1893 establishments in England
Football clubs in England
Football clubs in Nottinghamshire
Central Midlands Football League
United Counties League